Ninzo (wrongly called Ninzam) is a Plateau language spoken by the Ninzo people of central Nigeria.

References

External links
 A Wordlist of Ninzo language of Central Nigeria and its affinities by Roger Blench (PDF)

Ninzic languages
Languages of Nigeria